de Buyer (pronounced Duh Bu yeh) is a French cookware manufacturer, founded in 1830, from the village Le Val-d'Ajol in the Vosges department. 
de Buyer produces around 3,000 different products: cookware made of steel, stainless steel, copper and non stick aluminium, mandoline slicers, silicone moulds, pastry utensils, etc.  On June 23, 2016, de Buyer acquired Marlux, a pepper, salt and spice mills manufacturer in France.

de Buyer products are mainly targeted at professional and serious gourmet consumers.

See also
Le Val-d'Ajol
Arthur de Buyer Coal Mine (the name is based on the same family)

References

External links

Manufacturing companies of France